Vanessa Kingori  is the Chief Business Officer, Condé Nast Britain and Vogue European Business Advisor. She is also British Vogue's Publishing Director. Prior to that, Kingori was the Publisher of British GQ across all platforms. She has worked for media publishing house Condé Nast UK for over a decade.

Life 
Kingori was born in Kenya, initially educated on the Caribbean island of Saint Kitts before moving permanently to London to complete her education. She went to the Royal Holloway College of the University of London. She worked on the London Evening Standard and then at Esquire before her tenure at Condé Nast.

In March 2015, she was appointed Publisher of British GQ across all platforms. 2016 marked her first year as publisher and GQ’s most successful year of  the last decade. GQ won several digital commercial awards in her tenure.
 
In September 2017, she was appointed Publishing Director of all British Vogue platforms - the first female publishing director in its over 100-year history. She is the first person of colour in the role and Condé Nast UK's youngest serving Publishing Director. Kingori began her role as Publishing Director of British Vogue in January 2018. 
 
In September 2021, Kingori was promoted to Chief Business Officer across the entire British company, covering all Conde Nast Britain brands - Vogue, GQ, GQ Style, Wired, Vanity Fair, Glamour, Tatler, Johansen's, Conde Nast Traveler, House & Garden and The World of Interiors. This is in addition to continuing her existing responsibilities directly leading British Vogue. She was also appointed as Vogue European Business Advisor.

Social Influence
Kingori is a visiting fellow at the University of the Arts London and sits on several boards and is a regular public speaker.

She has sat on the judging panel of the Black British Business Awards since 2015. and has been regularly listed as one of the UK's 100 most influential Black Britons by the Powerlist, with her most recent appearance in the 2021 edition.

In January 2017, the Mayor of London, Sadiq Khan appointed her to his Brexit Advisory Panel which gives advice following the vote to leave the European Union.

In her work as youth advocate, Kingori sits on UAL's board of directors as a governor and trustee and enjoys a long-standing role as visiting fellow at the University of the Arts London, where she supports and mentors students across the institution's six colleges, which include Central Saint Martins and London College of Fashion. This is in addition to her key responsibilities giving governance regarding the organisations key business decisions. Vanessa was awarded a UAL Honorary Doctorate in 2018 and an Honorary Fellowship from Royal Holloway in 2021.

Kingori's work as diversity proponent includes the judging panel of the Black British Business Awards, the Veuve Clicquot Business Women of The Year Award, The Mayor of London's TFL's diversity in advertising competition. Vanessa is a member of The Royal College of Obstetricians and Gynaecologists Race Equality Taskforce. In support of women entrepreneurs, Vanessa is also part of a microfund Peanut StartHer which is focused on helping pre-seed entrepreneurs in tech and business, with a particular focus on giving purpose driven startups, founded by women, their first boost.

#ShareTheMicUK 
In October 2020, during the UK's Black History Month, Kingori organised and lead the #ShareTheMic UK campaign to highlight the accomplishments and contribution of high achieving Black women, using the allyship of successful White women. The project was backed by Instagram and participants included Priya Ahluwalia, Bernadine Evaristo, Bianca Saunders, June Sarpong, Emma Dabiri, Kourtney Kardashian, Gwyneth Paltrow, Victoria Beckham, Sheryl Sandberg, Christiane Amanpour and Brooke Shields with a combined audience of 175 million.
The campaign helped to launch several exciting new collaborations, inspiring conversations, books, podcasts and new friendships between unlikely pairings. Kingori said she had never witnessed more meaningful, honest discussions about racial disparity as she has amid the challenges and tragedies of 2020.

Honours and awards
Kingori was appointed Member of the Order of the British Empire (MBE) in the 2016 Birthday Honours and Officer of the Order of the British Empire (OBE) in the 2023 New Year Honours for services to the media industry.

Kingori was awarded the "Media Mogul of the Year" award at the 2017 Black Magic Awards.

In May 2018, Kingori was listed as second on the Financial Times "EMpower 100 Ethnic Minority Leaders" list and she was awarded a Best of Africa Special Award.

In July 2018, Kingori was awarded an Honorary Doctorate from University of the Arts London and she was placed onto The Female FTSE Board Report 2018 "100 Women to Watch" list by Cranfield University.

From 2013 to 2021, Kingori has been regularly listed as one of the UK's 100 most influential Black Britons" by the Powerlist.

In 2020, Kingori topped Campaign's 2020 Trailblazers list alongside British Vogue's Editor-in-chief Edward Enninful.

References

Living people
Kenyan emigrants to the United Kingdom
British magazine editors
British fashion journalists
Alumni of Royal Holloway, University of London
Officers of the Order of the British Empire
Year of birth missing (living people)